Crusader of Centy is an action-adventure game developed by Nextech for the Sega Genesis. The story centers on Corona, a boy who has just turned 14 years of age and must inherit his late father's sword to fight the monsters that threaten the human race's existence. Gameplay uses an overhead perspective and focuses on exploring, battling enemies with a sword, and solving puzzles. As the story progresses, numerous animals join the hero and aid him. They are used in gameplay like weapons or tools, which often grant passage to previously inaccessible areas.

Gameplay 

Early in the game, Corona finds himself losing his ability to speak to fellow humans, and instead gaining the ability to speak to animals. Some of them will join him, lending Corona their abilities while they are "equipped". Each animal has its own special technique. The very first animal the player gets is Corona's pet dog, Mac (US version), or Johnny (UK version). He can hold enemies down for Corona to attack. Later, the player gets a penguin, named Chilly (US version), or Penguy (UK version), which will power up Corona's sword with an ice attack. Corona can equip two abilities at a time. A total of 16 animals can be obtained.

Plot 
In Soleil Town, a law requires that all 14-year-old boys go to train and prepare for battle. The game's hero, Corona, has just turned fourteen at the beginning of the game. As such, Corona receives the sword and shield of his father, who died in battle and had a great reputation for his bravery in defending the city.

The story is divided into two parts. Corona must first take time to discover his world and unlock the various levels that make it up. He can then access them at his leisure. During this half of the game, Corona will not have the ability to speak to humans, but only to animals and plants. Only after beating Dragon (Maldra the Dragon in the US version) will the second half of the game begin: Corona has recovered the ability to talk to humans and he will travel through time to build a better world and understand why the monsters are at war with humanity.

Development and release 
Crusader of Centy was developed by Nextech. The game was published by Sega in Japan in 1994 under the title Ragnacënty. It was developed and released as part of a promotional campaign called "Mega Role-Play Project". The game was later released in Europe under the title Soleil. Atlus published the game the following year in North America and retitled it Crusader of Centy and released it in March 1995 at the retail price of $70.

Crusader of Centy sold poorly, but was praised by critics for its gameplay and graphics. The game was eventually discovered by collectors and was praised for its achievements. The US version of the game has become a collector's item due to its poor initial sales. Atlus also released a hint book in 1995 alongside the game. The hint book was reportedly only available via mail-in order forum page inside the games manual. As a result of this, the hint book itself has also become a rare collectors item and since then, no online scan exists of it archived.

Reception 

The game received positive reviews from critics. The four reviewers of Electronic Gaming Monthly contended that the game is a worthy Zelda clone, with Ed Semrad and Sushi-X going so far as to say it is equally good as the Zelda series. They identified the story and Zelda-like play mechanics as the game's strongest points. Three reviewers each scored it 8 out of 10 and one scored it 7. Scary Larry of GamePro viewed the game as Sega's answer to The Legend of Zelda: A Link to the Past, and remarked that "While Zelda had tons of hidden surprises, weapons, and fearsome bosses (making it one of the best action/RPGs ever), Crusader of Centy has a too-familiar story line, minor enemies, and a serious shortage of puzzles." He nonetheless concluded that, though serious RPG fans would "breeze through" it, the game successfully appeals to its younger target audience. Next Generation rated it three stars out of five, and stated that "Centy is a mirror image of the immensely popular Zelda, and is a load of fun that Genesis owners have yet to experience."

The also received positive retrospective reviews. Jeuxvideo.com rated the game with a 17 out of 20 score.

Notes

References

External links 
 Crusader of Centy at GameFAQs
 Crusader of Centy at MobyGames

1994 video games
Action-adventure games
Atlus games
Nex Entertainment games
Sega Genesis games
Sega Genesis-only games
Sega video games
Top-down video games
Video games developed in Japan